Westdale is a neighborhood in the Westside region of Los Angeles, California. It is represented by and has representatives on the Mar Vista Community Council.

Geography
Westdale is roughly bounded on the north by Gateway Boulevard, on the south by Palms Boulevard, on the east by Sawtelle Boulevard and the west by Bundy Drive.

History
Originally known as Stephen's Ranch, with citrus orchards and bean fields, Westdale was developed in 1947 by real estate developer Paul Trousdale (1915-1990). He hired architect Allen Siple (1900-1973) to design the homes. He worked with Siple on two other new neighborhoods he developed, the earlier 1940s Tahquitz River Estates in Palm Springs, and the later 1950s Trousdale Estates in Beverly Hills.<ref name="hess">Alan Hess, Forgotten modern: California houses 1940-1970', Layton, Utah: Gibbs Smith, 2007, pp. 262-264 </ref>

Trousdale built 450 single-story tract homes in the original development.Helene Lesel, Small-town living on the Westside, The Los Angeles Times, September 26, 2004Molly Selvin, Facades May Change but Sense of Place Remains the Same, The Los Angeles Times, October 11, 1997 Early residents were soldiers back from the Second World War using the GI Bill, who moved to Southern California after serving in the Pacific Theater. Over time, two additional tracts were added to Westdale.

Present day
There are now 900 homes in Westdale. Most were built in the 1940s, and many gardens have old citrus trees dating back to the original orchard. The architecture styles include Ranch-style, American Colonial Revival, Monterey Colonial Revival, and Regency Revival.

The Westdale Homeowners' Association publishes a quarterly newsletter, The Westdale Villager''.

References

Neighborhoods in Los Angeles
Mar Vista, Los Angeles
Westside (Los Angeles County)